Spuds is a 1927 American silent comedy film directed by Edward Ludwig and starring Larry Semon, Dorothy Dwan and Edward Hearn.

Synopsis
In France during World War I, an American doughboy attempts to recover a car carrying a payroll of two hundred and fifty thousand dollars stolen by German spies.

Cast
 Larry Semon as Spuds 
 Dorothy Dwan as Madelon 
 Edward Hearn as Captain Arthur 
 Kewpie Morgan as Sergeant 
 Robert Graves as General 
 Hazel Howell as Bertha 
 Hugh Fay as Spy

References

Bibliography
 Munden, Kenneth White. The American Film Institute Catalog of Motion Pictures Produced in the United States, Part 1. University of California Press, 1997.

External links

1927 films
1927 comedy films
Silent American comedy films
Films directed by Edward Ludwig
American silent feature films
1920s English-language films
Pathé Exchange films
American black-and-white films
American World War I films
Films set in France
1920s American films